Ferry Carondelet (also Ferricus Carondelet) (1473 – 27 June 1528) was a Habsburg diplomat, advisor to  Margaret of Austria and abbot  at Montbenoît. He was the younger brother of Jean Carondelet.

Biography
Ferry Carondelet was born in Mechelen, Flanders, to a rich, bourgeois and influential family originally from Dole. He grew up in Burgundy, at the time a Habsburg province under Emperor Maximilian I, and matriculated at the University of Franche-Comté, where he took clerical orders. In 1504 he was named Archdeacon of the Besançon church.

In 1508 Ferry Carondelet became confessor (church advisor) to Margaret of Austria, the regent of the Spanish Netherlands, and incidentally to her ward, the future  Holy Roman Emperor, Charles V . In 1510 he was made Papal Legate to the court of Emperor Maximilian. In 1515 he returned to Burgundy and became the abbot of the Saint Columbanus abbey in Montbenoît.

Ferry Carondelet is known as a major benefactor of the Montbenoît abbey and the cathedral in Besançon. He commissioned the Italian painter Fra Bartolomeo to create the Carondelet Altar for Besançon, and he completely rebuilt the church for the Montbenoît abbey. He died on 27 June 1528 and is buried in a marble tomb in the Cathedrale Saint Jean in Besançon.

References
Borgo, Ludovico (1971) “The Problem of the Ferry Carondelet Altar-Piece” Burlington Magazine, Vol. 113, No. 820 (Jul., 1971), pp. 362–371.
L. de la Brière, 'Dépêches de Ferry Carondelet, Procureur en Cour de Rome (1510–1513)', Bulletin Historique et Philologique du Comité de Travaux Historiques et Scientifiques (1895), pp. 98–134.

1473 births
1528 deaths
Clergy from Mechelen
Diplomats of the Holy See
University of Franche-Comté alumni
Abbots of the Spanish Netherlands
Renaissance people